Yoandri Díaz Carmenate (born January 4, 1985) is a volleyball player from Cuba, who plays in different positions. He was a member of the Men's National Team that claimed the bronze medal at the 2005 America's Cup in São Leopoldo.

References
 FIVB Profile

1985 births
Living people
Cuban men's volleyball players
Volleyball players at the 2007 Pan American Games
Place of birth missing (living people)
Pan American Games bronze medalists for Cuba
Pan American Games medalists in volleyball
Medalists at the 2011 Pan American Games
21st-century Cuban people